The Bobocu gas field natural gas field in Bobocu village, Cochirleanca Commune, Buzău County. It was discovered in 1966 and first developed by Romgaz the Romanian national gas company but was abandoned in 1995 due to sand influx in well boreholes. The field was acquired by Zeta Petroleum in 1998. It will begin production in 2011 and will produce natural gas and condensates. The total proven reserves of the Bobocu gas field are around 147 billion cubic feet (4.2 km³), and production is slated to be around 25 million cubic feet/day (0.71×105m³) in 2011.

References

Natural gas fields in Romania